Cecidophyopsis is a genus of mites belonging to the family Eriophyidae.

The species of this genus are found in Europe.

Species:

Cecidophyopsis alpina 
Cecidophyopsis atrichus 
Cecidophyopsis aurea 
Cecidophyopsis betulae 
Cecidophyopsis championus 
Cecidophyopsis entrotrombidium 
Cecidophyopsis grossulariae 
Cecidophyopsis hendersoni 
Cecidophyopsis malpighianus 
Cecidophyopsis persicae 
Cecidophyopsis psilaspis 
Cecidophyopsis pulchellus 
Cecidophyopsis ribis 
Cecidophyopsis ruebsaameni 
Cecidophyopsis selachodon 
Cecidophyopsis spicata 
Cecidophyopsis verilicis
Cecidophyopsis vermiformis

References

Eriophyidae